Sydney is home to some of Australia's most prestigious universities, technical institutions and schools. Entry to tertiary education for most students is via the New South Wales secondary school system where students are ranked by the Australian Tertiary Admission Rank (ATAR).

Universities

 

Sydney is home to some of Australia's most prominent Universities, and is also the site of Australia's first university, the University of Sydney, established in 1850. There are five other public universities operating primarily in Sydney; Macquarie University, the University of New South Wales, the University of Technology, Sydney, Western Sydney University, and the Australian Catholic University (two out of six campuses). Other universities which operate secondary campuses in Sydney include the University of Notre Dame Australia, University of Wollongong and University of Newcastle.

TAFE

There are four multi-campus government-funded Technical and Further Education (TAFE) institutes in Sydney which provide vocational training at a tertiary level; namely, the Sydney Institute of Technology, North Sydney Institute of TAFE, Western Sydney Institute of TAFE (including OTEN) and South Western Sydney Institute of TAFE.

Schools
State schools, including pre-schools, primary and secondary schools, and special schools are administered by the New South Wales Department of Education and Training. There are four state administered education areas in the Sydney metropolitan area that together coordinate 932 schools. There are also a large amount of private schools located in the Sydney region, most of which are either Catholic or Grammar Schools. Selective schools are high schools that admit students on the basis of certain criteria, usually academic testing through the selective schools test which is hosted each year usually in March to Year 6 students.

International schools in Sydney include the Lycée Condorcet, the French school; and the Sydney Japanese International School, the Japanese school.

Miscellaneous education
The Sydney Saturday School of Japanese (SSSJ; シドニー日本語土曜学校　Shidonī Nihongo Doyō Gakkō), a weekend Japanese educational programme, holds classes for Japanese national and Japanese Australian students at the Cammeray Public School in Cammeray.

References